Brisë is a village in the administrative unit of Lekbibaj in Kukës County, Albania.

References

Populated places in Tropojë
Villages in Kukës County